Victoria Shaw may refer to:

Victoria Shaw (singer) (born 1962), American country music artist
Victoria Shaw (actress) (1935–1988), Australian-born American actress